is a Japanese sports sailor. She competed in the 2011 ISAF Sailing World Championships – Women's 470 with Ai Kondo Yoshida, finishing in 6th place.  She won the gold in the Women's 470 (also with Kondo) at the 2010 Asian Games as a representative of Japan.  At the 2012 Summer Olympics, she competed in the Women's 470 class, once again with Kondo.

References

1983 births
Living people
Japanese female sailors (sport)
Olympic sailors of Japan
Sailors at the 2012 Summer Olympics – 470
Asian Games medalists in sailing
Asian Games gold medalists for Japan
Sailors at the 2010 Asian Games
Medalists at the 2010 Asian Games